Listen: The Very Best Of is a greatest hits album released in 2002 by New Zealand reggae group, Herbs. The album reached number one on the New Zealand music charts.

Track listing
The album featured a number of songs that had never appeared on Herbs albums: 
 "Good for Life" 
 "Slice of Heaven" (which had previously appeared on the Footrot Flats soundtrack and Dave Dobbyn's Loyal) 
 "Parihaka" (a version without Herbs had appeared on Tim Finn's self-titled album)
 "French Letter '95" 
 "See What Love Can Do" (which had appeared on Annie Crummer's Language).

Charts

Weekly charts

Year-end charts

References

2002 greatest hits albums
Herbs (band) compilation albums
Warner Music Group compilation albums